According to traditional Chinese uranography, the modern constellation Lepus is located within the western quadrant of the sky, which is symbolized as The White Tiger of the West (西方白虎, Xī Fāng Bái Hǔ)

The name of the western constellation in modern Chinese is 天兔座 (tiān tù zuò), meaning "the celestial rabbit constellation".

Stars
The map of Chinese constellation in constellation Lepus area consists of :

See also
Traditional Chinese star names
Chinese constellations

References

External links
Lepus – Chinese associations

Astronomy in China
Lepus (constellation)